Kana Kaanum Kaalangal also known by the initialism KKK, is a 2022 Indian Tamil-language streaming television series that airs on Disney+ Hotstar. It is a reboot of the 2006 television series of the same name, which aired on Star Vijay. The story revolves around the struggles of a group of high school students and what they face during their secondary school life such as jealousy, rivalry, misunderstandings, arguments and personal grudges.Season 1 ended with episode 132. While Season 2 is expected to release after summer.

The series stars Teja Venkatesh, Raja Vetri Prabhu, Aravind Seiju and Deepika Venkatachalam, while VJ Sangeetha, Irfan, Aashik Gopinath,Rajesh, Bharath Kumar, Deepika Damu, Akshathaa Ajit, Pranika, Pragateesh, Aegan, VJ Kalyani, Surendar KPY and others appear in supporting roles. Filming for the series commenced in mid June 2021. The series premiered on 22 April 2022. It also airs on Star Vijay from 26 December 2022 on Monday to Friday at 5:30PM.

Plot
The show begins with a school being shown and it's correspondent, Mr shaktivel talking to the cleaner, sagayam about it's reopening after the pandemic. Then we get introduced to Kalai, a boy who is seen sitting in front of a house with a knife and what happened is not revealed. He gets arrested by inspector Nagarajan, who gets scarred below his left eye by kalai. Kalai ends up in the juvenile center, where nagarajan attempts to kill him using other inmates. Kalai is saved by jayakumar, the warden, and sent to siragugal higher matriculation secondary school, where he gets a chance to restart his life.

Series overview

Streaming

Television broadcast

Cast and characters

Starring
 Bharath Kumar as Gunasekhar
 VJ Sangeetha as Malar (Kanaa Kaanum Kaalangal Teacher)
 Aravind Seiju as Kalaiarasan "Kalai"
 Raja Vetri Prabhu as Gautham
 Irfan as Vineeth alias "Jerry"
 Teja Venkatesh as Nandhini
 Deepika Venkatachalam as Abirami "Abi"
 Aashik Gopinath  as Kicha
 Pranika/Abeneya as Parvathy

Supporting
 Vishwa Mithran as Raju (Sarpatta Reels)
 Akshathaa Ajit as Stella
 KPY Tsk as Bullet
 Aegan as Chellamuthu
 Surendar kpy (surendar vj) as Psycho Aadhi
 KPY Thidiyan as Kuzhandhai
 Deepika Damu as Haritha
 VJ Kalyani as Shweta
 Parvez Musharaf as Vicky
 Sathyanarayanan (Dolby Sathya) (Blacksheep) as Gopi
 Velu Lakshmanan (Aryan) as Raghu
 Rajmohan as PT Master
 Maurish Frank as Ayogya
 Preethiga as Preethi
 Keerthan Subash as Vasanth
 Pragatheeswaran (Blacksheep/Unakkennapaa) as Pandi
 Seetha Anil as Maariamma, Nandhini's mother
 Deepthi Shree as Devi, Nandhini's younger sister
 Bharath Mohan
 Kamalesh PK as Abi's father
 Kavitha as Abi's mother
 Udhaya as Sagayam (Watchman)
 KPY Pazhani as Poochi
 Boys Rajan as Bhairavan, School Principal
 Bharath Kalyan as Nachiyappan
 Sanjay Mohan as Richie
 Saro as Saro
 Ashika Yash as Ashika
 Vidur as Vidur
 Murali as Moile
 Surya as Senior role
 Vishal Prabu as Senior role
 Lavakushan as Piraccanai
 Monisha Ravishankar as Sanghavi, Jerry's close friend in school days (Episode 42)(archival footage of old Kana Kaanum Kaalangal)
 Rajesh as Shakthivel (Passed)
 Sandy Master as Judge (dance competition)
 Kalaiarasan as Judge(drama competition)
 MJ Sriram as Judge (singing competition)
 Padmapriya as Judge
 Santhosh Prathap as Rockstar Ashok
 Mohan Vaidya as tamil sir
 Anumohan as social sir
 R. Aravindraj as Maths sir
 Arun Prasath as himself
 Archana as herself
 Rithika Tamilselvi as herself

Production

Release
The first teaser for the show was released in January 2022 and it was officially set to launch in February 2022, however due to some technical error during the shooting for the show, the release date was pushed to 22 April 2022.

Episodes

References

External links
 Official Website at Hotstar
 

Tamil-language Disney+ Hotstar original programming
Star Vijay original programming
Tamil-language school television series
Tamil-language teen television series
Tamil-language romance television series
2022 Tamil-language television series debuts
Tamil-language web series